Westfield Century City (formerly known as the Century Square Shopping Center) is a two-level, 1.3 million-square-foot outdoor shopping mall in the Century City commercial district in Los Angeles, California. A property of the Westfield Corporation, the mall is anchored by Nordstrom, Bloomingdale's, Macy's, a Gelson's supermarket, and a 15-screen AMC multiplex.

History
Westfield Century City opened in 1964 as the Century Square Shopping Center, anchored by The Broadway. In 1976, the mall's parking lot was turned into an expansion of the mall, bringing a Bullock's and several new retail stores. An AMC cinema and a new food court, referred to as "The Marketplace" opened in 1987. In 1996, both The Broadway and Bullock's closed when The Broadway's struggling parent Carter Hawley Hale was acquired by Federated Department Stores. Federated converted The Broadway store into Bloomingdale's and the Bullock's into a Macy's.

Australian shopping center developer Westfield Group acquired a 50% stake in the shopping center in 2002 and renamed it "Westfield Shoppingtown Century City". The Shoppingtown moniker was dropped from all Westfield properties in 2005.

In 2004, Westfield initiated a $160 million renovation. The renovation replaced the 1980s-era food court and movie theater with an alfresco Dining Terrace and a flagship 15-screen AMC cinema. The renovation also brought a new two-level retail building housing a Borders bookstore and a Container Store on the top level and numerous retailers on the bottom, a reskin of the existing Bloomingdale's store, the addition of a restaurant row facing Santa Monica Boulevard, and a general remodeling of the center. Borders went out of business in 2011.

Expansion
In 2009, a radical expansion and renovation of Westfield Century City was approved. The original plans for the expansion called for a 49-story residential and office building with a relocated Bloomingdale's at the base, the addition of more than 350,000 square feet of retail space, and more than 1,000 new parking spaces. Ten stories were eliminated from the proposed building at the behest of Century City residents.

After years of delays, lawsuits, and neighborhood protests, a revamped expansion plan was unveiled in 2013. After further tweaking, the expansion was approved and commenced construction in 2015. The oldest portions of the property, including the Welton Becket–designed Gateway West Building and Macy's, were demolished and replaced with new two-level and three-level retail buildings. A planned residential tower was removed from the project to make way for additional retail, which now numbered more than 1.3 million square feet. The first phase of the project, including the new Macy's store, opened on April 6, 2017. The second major phase, including Nordstrom, opened to the public on October 3, 2017.

The final piece of the $1 billion project, Italian marketplace concept Eataly, opened on November 3, 2017.

In April 2022, Unibail-Rodamco-Westfield announced their plan to sell all 24 malls in the United States within 2 years.

It was also hit by smash and grab robberies with 14 suspects snatch high-end merchandise, targeting Nordstrom.

See also

 Westfield Group

References 

Century City
Shopping malls on the Westside, Los Angeles
Shopping malls established in 1964
Century City, Los Angeles
1964 establishments in California